Myosotis azorica, common name Azorean mouse-ear or Azorean forget-me-not, is a plant species endemic to the Azores Islands in the North Atlantic Ocean.

Description
Myosotis azorica is a perennial herb with decumbent stems up to 30 cm (12 inches) tall. Leaves are lanceolate, clasping the stem, with numerous soft flexible hairs. Flowers are borne in "scorpioid cymes," i.e. on spirally curving stems resembling a scorpion's tail or a half-unfurled fiddlehead fern leaf. Flowers are deep blue-purple with a yellow center.

Distribution and habitat
Myosotis azorica is endemic to the western Azores, occurring only on the westernmost islands of Flores and Corvo. The last wild populations on Flores went extinct recently. Reports from other islands in the Azores are confusions with the related Myosotis maritima, a strictly coastal species. It grows near waterfalls and on wet rocks and in wet meadows above 500 meters altitude.

References

azorica
Endemic flora of the Azores
Plants described in 1842